Thomas Marston Green Sr. (November 19, 1723 – 1805) was a Colonel in the American Revolutionary War.

Early life
Thomas was born in Williamsburg, Virginia to Thomas Green III and Elizabeth Marston. His family was prosperous and Thomas's schooling was by a private tutor.

The American Revolution, Georgia, and Mississippi
Not much is known of Green's service in the Revolution. What is known is that he was a commissioned Colonel in the Colonial Army. He later moved to Georgia where he met and befriended General George Rogers Clark. After discussing a plan with Clark, Thomas gathered a small army. Green gathered his men at the Holston River where they built a small fleet of boats. After floating down the river the party did not find George as expected so they continued on to Natchez, Mississippi.  Thomas received an interview with the Spanish Governor Manuel Gayoso de Lemos where he claimed the entire district for Georgia. The Spanish expecting a revolt had him arrested and thrown in prison in New Orleans. Soon afterward his wife Martha came down to have him released, but she soon after died of exposure and stress. The Governor feeling sympathy for the Green family released Thomas. He settled his family in Jefferson County, Mississippi where he became one of the most influential men in the territory. He was also instrumental in forming Bourbon county the 2nd largest county in the United States history when he had the Bourbon Act of 1785 passed.

Andrew Jackson and Rachel Donelson
Green is perhaps most famous for the marrying of Andrew Jackson to Rachel Donelson. Sometime in 1791 at his family's Springfield Plantation, Green, as one of the magistrates of the Mississippi Territory, married the couple.

Wife and children
On November 21, 1752 Thomas married Martha Wills with whom he fathered ten children, the most well-known of his children being Congressman Thomas M. Green Jr.

Notes

Sources
 Colonel Thomas M. Green Sr.

1723 births
1805 deaths
People from Williamsburg, Virginia
Continental Army officers from Virginia
Virginia colonial people
Burials in Mississippi